Väinö Eerikki Raitio (15 April 1891, in Sortavala, Grand Duchy of Finland – 10 September 1945, in Helsinki) was part of the small group of composers who appeared in the Finnish art music scene in the 1920s with a new cosmopolitan music style, very different from the dominant conservative National Romanticism.

Raitio's career as a composer reached its peak in the 1920s when eight large symphonic poems appeared from his pen. Influenced by Alexander Scriabin, his style was too modern for Nordic music circles, and his orchestral work Joutsenet (The Swans, Les Cygnes) of 1919 remained as his sole orchestral piece to be published (in 1938).

Raitio's profile as a composer slipped, as he concentrated on shorter works for smaller ensembles in the 1930s and 1940s. In private, however, much effort was made by the composer to write operatic works. Still today, his five operas are only known from the composer's hand-written manuscripts.

Works

Early period (–1919)
Violin Sonata in F sharp minor
String Quartet in G minor op. 10
Piano concerto op. 6
Poème for cello and orchestra op. 7
Symphonic Ballade op. 9
Symphony in G Minor op. 13

Reaching maturity (1919–1920s)
Joutsenet op. 15 ('The Swans'/'Les Cygnes')
Piano Quintet in C sharp minor, op. 16
Nocturne op. 17
Fantasy for quintet op. 19
Fantasia estatica op. 21
Four Colour poems for piano op. 22Antigone Trilogy op. 23Moonlight on Jupiter op. 24Fantasia poetica op. 25The Pyramide for mixed choir and orchestra op. 27The Avenue for soprano and orchestra op. 29

Back to traditional forms (1930s–40s)Suite Summer Scenes from HämeForest Idylls Scherzo Felix domesticaLegend for violin and orchestra
Double concerto for violin, cello and orchestraThe Maids on the HeadlandsIdyllNotturno for violin and orchestraSerenata for violin and orchestraFantasy for cello, harp and orchestra

Stage works
5 Operas:Jeftan tytär (The Daughter of Jephtha), op. 30 (1929)Prinsessa Cecilia (Princess Cecilia) (1933)Lyydian kuningas (The King of Lydia) (1937)Väinämöisen kosinta (Väinämöinen's Proposal) (1934–1936)Kaksi kuningatarta (The Two Queens')
Ballet The Waterspout (Vesipatsas)
Le ballet grotesque

Further reading

External links
 Väinö Raitio Society (mostly in Finnish)
 Music Finland composer material

1891 births
1945 deaths
20th-century classical composers
Finnish male classical composers
Finnish classical composers
Finnish opera composers
20th-century male musicians
Male opera composers
People from Sortavala
People from Viipuri Province (Grand Duchy of Finland)
20th-century Finnish composers